Shah Muhammad Zafarullah is a Bangladesh Awami League politician and the former Member of Parliament of Rajshahi-13.

Career
Zafarullah was elected to parliament from Rajshahi-13 as an Awami League candidate in 1973.

References

Awami League politicians
Living people
1st Jatiya Sangsad members
Year of birth missing (living people)